Tinne may refer to:

 Tinne (letter), the Irish name of the eighth letter of the Ogham alphabet
 16676 Tinne, minor planet
 Tinne (name), Germanic female given name
 Tinne (surname), Dutch surname